Fork in the Road is the 29th studio album by Canadian / American musician Neil Young, released April 7, 2009, on Reprise Records. The album was released on vinyl on July 26, 2009.

The album was inspired by Young's Lincoln Continental that had been retooled to run entirely on alternative energy, and Young's background with the Lincvolt project he has been working on alongside mechanic Jonathan Goodwin. The project has been to develop a viable electric energy power system for automobiles. Young's own 1959 Lincoln Continental will serve as their completed prototype. A documentary produced by Larry Johnson followed the electric car in its first long-distance trip to Washington, DC.

In November 2010, the car started a fire that caused over a million dollars of damage to a warehouse and possessions of Young stored there. Young blamed the fire on human error and said he and his team were committed to rebuilding the car. "The wall charging system was not completely tested and had never been left unattended. A mistake was made. It was not the fault of the car", he said.

Young's vocal performance on "Fork in the Road" was nominated for Best Solo Rock Vocal Performance at the 52nd Grammy Awards, 2010.

Track listing
All songs written and composed by Neil Young

Personnel
Produced by "The Volume Dealers" (Neil Young and Niko Bolas)
Recorded and mixed by Niko Bolas
Neil Young – electric and acoustic guitar, vocals
Ben Keith – lap steel guitar, electric guitar, Hammond B-3 organ, vocals
Anthony Crawford – electric and acoustic guitar, piano, Hammond B-3 organ, vocals
Pegi Young – vibes, acoustic guitar, vocals
Rick Rosas – bass
Chad Cromwell – drums
Larry Cragg – guitar technician
Don McAulay – drum technician
Craig Roberts – guitar technician

Recorded at: 
Legacy Studios, New York City
RAK Studios, London England 
Mixed at: 
Blackbird Studios Nashville, TN Legacy Studios, New York City
RAK Studios, London England

Second engineers: Missy Webb - Legacy Studios, Rich Woodcraft - RAK Studios Assistant engineers: Kevin Porter, Heidi Martin - Legacy Studios 
John Netti, Nathan Yarborough - Blackbird Studios Production Assistant: Anthony Acquilato - Legacy Studios 
Digital editing by Richard Dodd 
Analog to digital transfers by John Nowland at Redwood Digital, John Netti at Blackbird Studios 
Mastered by- Richard Dodd Nashville, TN

Blu-ray production 
Directed by Bernard Shakey
Produced by L.A. Johnson
Executive Producer- Elliot Rabinowitz
Associate Producer- Will Mitchell
Art direction by Toshi Onuki
Edited by Mark Faulkner and Benjamin Johnson
Additional mix- Christopher Hedge at The Magic Shop
Production assistance- Kris Kunz, Sue Ann Roberts
DTS 5.1 Surround mastering by Tim Mulligan at Redwood Digital
DTS 5.1 Surround Encoding: MX, San Francisco, CA
Blu-ray authoring & programming by- MX, San Francisco, CA
Post Production at Total Media Group, South San Francisco, CA

Music videos:
Directed by Bernard Shakey
Produced by L.A. Johnson
Directors of Photography- Benjamin Johnson and Neil Young
Audio Production- Will Mitchell
Edited by Toshi Onuki and Benjamin Johnson

Studio videos:
Directed by Bernard Shakey
Produced by L.A. Johnson
Director of Photography- L.A. Johnson
Edited by Mark Faulkner

A Day in the Life concert video:
Directed by Benjamin Johnson
Menu photographs by Steve Cross, L.A. Johnson, Will Mitchell, Toshi Onuki, Shakey Pictures
Band photographs by Larry Cragg, Shakey Pictures

Charts

References

External links 
"Fork in the Road" video on NeilYoung.com

2009 albums
Neil Young albums
Reprise Records albums
Concept albums
Albums produced by Neil Young
Albums produced by Niko Bolas